Mhow Indore Passenger was a passenger train of Indian Railways, which ran between Indore Junction railway station (MG) to Mhow railway station in the Central Indian state of Madhya Pradesh. In 2015, the train was cancelled due to closure of Indore - Mhow line for Gauge Conversion.

Arrival and departure
Train no. 52962 departed from Mhow, daily at 03:50 hrs., reaching Indore the same day at 04:40 hrs. Train no. 52979 departed from Indore daily at 22:05 hrs reaching Mhow the same day at 23:00 hrs. The train covered the 21 km journey in 50 minutes with an average speed of 25 km/h.

Route and halts
The train ran via Dewas and Ujjain. The important halts of the train were:

 Indore Junction
 Saifi Nagar railway station
 Lokmanya Nagar railway station
 Rajendra Nagar railway station
 Rau railway station
 Haranya Kheri railway station
 Mhow railway station

Coach composite
The train consisted of 9 coaches :
 9 unreserved coach
 2 luggage/brake van coach
 1 sleeper coach

References

Transport in Indore
Rail transport in Madhya Pradesh
Slow and fast passenger trains in India
Railway services discontinued in 2015